Horistothrips is a genus of thrips in the family Phlaeothripidae.

Species
 Horistothrips australiae
 Horistothrips claruspilus
 Horistothrips magnafemora
 Horistothrips palidispinosus
 Horistothrips platygaster

References

Phlaeothripidae
Thrips
Thrips genera